Notre Dame de Sion School is a preschool through grade 12 certified college preparatory school located in Kansas City, Missouri. This Roman Catholic school was founded by the Sisters of Notre Dame de Sion in 1912. The all-girls, high school campus is located in South Kansas City, and the co-educational grade school campus is located in the Hyde Park neighborhood. The two campuses are about 10 miles apart.

History

Hyde Park
In 1892, the Congregation arrived in the United States when four Sisters of Sion began educating young children in Auburn and Lewiston, Maine. By 1904, the number of Sisters had grown to sixty. In 1907, the Sisters transferred to Marshall, Missouri, where they taught at Sion Academy until 1925. In 1912, Bishop Thomas Francis Lillis invited seven Sisters to Kansas City. Two taught in the Annunciation School. The others began a French kindergarten and gave private sewing, music and French lessons, which grew into the Notre Dame de Sion School. For decades to follow, the Sisters continued managing and growing the institution, building their first campus in Kansas City’s historic Hyde Park.

In 1953, Bobby Greenlease was kidnapped from the Hyde Park school by a woman claiming to be his aunt. The $600,000 ransom paid by his family was the largest paid to that point, although Greenlease had been killed before the ransom was paid.

The original campus at 3823 Locust is now co-ed and includes PreK Montessori, and kindergarten through middle school.

South Kansas City
In 1962, the high school moved to south Kansas City at 10631 Wornall Rd. Six years later the Sisters invited lay members to serve on the school's board of trustees, and in 1990 the ownership of the school was transferred to the Board.

Sion today
Notre Dame de Sion is still located in the South Kansas City campus.

Sion has a musical and plays. It also has a drum line and choir.

Sion's dance team won 10th overall in the nation in 2019 and has won 1st place in the state of Missouri for ten consecutive years. Other sports include basketball, softball, cheerleading, swim, dive, soccer, volleyball, field hockey, lacrosse, cross-country, and track.

Governance
Notre Dame de Sion in Kansas City is one of seventeen Sion schools worldwide. Notre Dame de Sion in Kansas City is affiliated with the Roman Catholic Diocese of Kansas City-St. Joseph as well as the Congregation of the Sisters of Notre Dame de Sion. The school is owned by a lay corporation and governed by a board of trustees.

Notable alumnae
Heidi Gardner - actress on Saturday Night Live 
Megan Barry - former Mayor of Nashville
Maggie Williams - Former Chief of Staff for Hillary Clinton, one of the early African-American graduates in the 1970s

External links

References

High schools in Kansas City, Missouri
Catholic secondary schools in Missouri
Educational institutions established in 1912
Girls' schools in Missouri
Private middle schools in Missouri
1912 establishments in Missouri
Roman Catholic Diocese of Kansas City–Saint Joseph
Preparatory schools in Missouri